The Easter Oratorio, 249, is an oratorio by Johann Sebastian Bach, beginning with  ("Come, hasten and run"). Bach composed it in Leipzig and first performed it on 1 April 1725.

History 

The first version of the work was completed as a cantata for Easter Sunday in Leipzig on 1 April 1725, then under the title . It was named "oratorio" and given the new title only in a version revised in 1735. In a later version in the 1740s the third movement was expanded from a duet to a four-part chorus. The work is based on a secular cantata, the so-called Shepherd Cantata , which is now lost, although the libretto survives. Its author is Picander who is also likely the author of the oratorio's text. The work is opened by two instrumental movements that are probably taken from a concerto of the Köthen period. It seems possible that the third movement is based on the concerto's finale.

Structure 

Unlike the Christmas Oratorio, the Easter Oratorio has no narrator but has four characters assigned to the four voice parts: Simon Peter (tenor) and John the Apostle (bass), appearing in the first duet hurrying to Jesus' grave and finding it empty, meeting there Mary Magdalene (alto) and "the other Mary", Mary Jacobe (soprano). The choir was present only in the final movement until a later performance in the 1740s when the opening duet was set partly for four voices. The music is festively scored for three trumpets, timpani, two oboes, oboe d'amore, bassoon, two recorders, transverse flute, two violins, viola and continuo.

Music 
The oratorio opens with two contrasting instrumental movements, an Allegro concerto grosso of the full orchestra with solo sections for trumpets, violins and oboes, and an Adagio oboe melody over "Seufzer" motifs (sighs) in the strings (in 3rd version, solo instrument is a Flute).

The first duet of the disciples was set for chorus in a later version, the middle section remaining a duet. Many runs illustrate the movement toward the grave.

, the aria of Mary Magdalene, is based on words from the Song of Songs, asking where to find the beloved, without whom she is "" (completely orphaned and desolate), set in the middle section as Adagio, different from the original. The words are close to those opening Part Two of the St Matthew Passion.

The final movement in two contrasting sections resembles the Sanctus composed for Christmas 1724 and later part of the Mass in B minor.

Recordings 
 Heinrich-Schütz-Chor Heilbronn, Pforzheim Chamber Orchestra, Edith Selig, Claudia Hellmann, Helmut Krebs, Jakob Stämpfli, conductor Fritz Werner, Erato 1964
 Süddeutscher Madrigalchor, Süddeutsches Kammerorchester, Teresa Żylis-Gara, Patricia Johnson, Theo Altmeyer, Dietrich Fischer-Dieskau, conductor Wolfgang Gönnenwein, HMV 1965
 Amsterdam Baroque Orchestra & Choir, Lisa Larsson, Elisabeth von Magnus, Gerd Türk, Klaus Mertens, conductor Ton Koopman, Erato, 1998
 Gabrieli Consort and Players, conductor Paul McCreesh, Archiv Produktion, 2001

Literature 
 Markus Rathey: Bach's Major Vocal Works: Music-Drama-Liturgy. London: Yale University Press, 2016, 138-165

References

External links 
 Autograph score in the Digitized Collections of Berlin State Library and in Bach digital
 
 Oster-Oratorium BWV 249 / Kommet, eilet und laufet history, scoring, sources for text and music, translations to various languages, discography, discussion, Bach Cantatas Website
 BWV 249 – BWV 249 – "Kommt, eilet und laufet, ihr flüchtigen Füße" / (The Easter Oratorio)  English translation, discussion, Emmanuel Music
 BWV 249 Kommt, eilet und laufet, ihr flüchtigen Füßen (Oster-Oratorium) English translation, University of Vermont
 BWV 249 Kommt, eilet und laufet, ihr flüchtigen Füße (Oster-Oratorium) text, scoring, University of Alberta
 
, State University of Music and Performing Arts Stuttgart, conductor Hans-Christoph Rademann

Passions and oratorios by Johann Sebastian Bach
1725 compositions
Music for Easter
Oratorios based on the Bible